Michael Bolton is the third studio album by American recording artist Michael Bolton. Released in 1983, it was Bolton's first record to be released on Columbia Records. This was also the first time that Bolton recorded under his stage name as his previous two albums had been released under his given name, Michael Bolotin.

It features then future Kiss guitarist Bruce Kulick on lead guitar, rotating with Bolton himself. Future Trans-Siberian Orchestra/Savatage/Megadeth guitarist Al Pitrelli replaced Kulick on the tour supporting the single, "Fool's Game", though the tour was cancelled after four shows.

Reception

The Rolling Stone Album Guide said the album was "better balanced and more pop-savvy [than the rest of Bolton's first four albums], but falters when he attempts an over-burdened rendition of The Supremes' 'Back in My Arms Again'."

Allmusic gave the album a generally negative retrospective review, saying that it was dominated by arena rock cliches, but acknowledged that "Bolton was an undeniably involving singer, and songs like 'Fools Game,' the lead-off track and chart single, were satisfying pop efforts".

Track listing

Production 
 Produced by Gerry Block and Michael Bolton
 Associate Producer – Jan Mullaney
 Executive Producer – Louis Levin
 Engineered by Carla Bandini, Gerry Block and John Convertino.
 Assistant Engineers – Barry Bongiovi, Jeffry Hendrickson, Linda Randazzo, Garry Rindfuss, Glenn Rosenstein and Jimmy Santis.
 Additional Recording by Tony Bongiovi
 Mixed by Tony Bongiovi (Tracks 1, 3, 4, 5, 7 & 8); Gerry Block (Tracks 2, 6 & 9).
 Recorded and Mixed at Sigma Sound Studios (Philadelphia, PA) and The Power Station (New York, NY).
 Mastered by Bob Ludwig at Masterdisk (New York, NY).
 Drum and Sound Technician – John Potoker
 Creative Direction – Louis Levin, David Krebs and Steve Leber.
 Design – Design
 Photography – David Kennedy

Personnel 
 Michael Bolton – lead and backing vocals, guitar solo (1, 3), lead guitar (5)
 Mark Mangold – synthesizers (1), backing vocals (1)
 Jan Mullaney – acoustic piano (1, 2, 3, 8), synthesizers (2-5, 8), Hammond organ (7)
 Scott Zito – backing vocals (2, 6), acoustic piano (6), synthesizers (6), lead guitar (6), rhythm guitar (6), bass (6)
 Aldo Nova – synthesizers (4), guitar solo (7)
 George Clinton – synthesizers (9), backing vocals (9)
 Doug Katsaros – acoustic piano (9)
 Craig Brooks – rhythm guitar (1), backing vocals (1, 3, 4, 5, 7, 8, 9)
 Bob Kulick – rhythm guitar (2-5, 7, 8, 9)
 Bruce Kulick – lead guitar (2), guitar solo (4)
 Mark Clarke – bass (1-5, 7, 8, 9)
 Michael Braun – drums (1)
 Chuck Burgi – drums (2-9)
 Lloyd Landesman – backing vocals (2, 4, 5, 7)

Cover versions
Eric Martin covered "Can't Hold On, Can't Let Go" on his 1985 album Eric Martin.
René Froger covered "I Almost Believed You" on his 1990 album Midnight Man.
Axel Rudi Pell covered "Fools Game" on his 2007 covers album Diamonds Unlocked.
Last Autumn's Dream covered "Fools Game" on their 2010 album Yes.
Houston covered "Carrie" on their 2011 EP Relaunch.

Certifications

References
Liner Notes; Michael Bolton CD (1983, Columbia/CBS Records)

1983 albums
Michael Bolton albums
Columbia Records albums